"Pueblito Viejo" (translation "old town") is a Colombian waltz written by José A. Morales. The song was inspired by the steep, cobbled streets of Socorro, Santander, where Morales spent his childhood. It won a gold record in 1966.

The song has been named as one of the top Colombian songs of all time by multiple media sources:

 In its list of the top ten Colombian songs, El Heraldo rated Colombia Tierra Querida at No. 4.

 In its list of the 50 best Colombian songs of all time, El Tiempo, Colombia's most widely circulated newspaper, ranked the version of the song by Garzón y Collazos at No. 12. 

 Viva Music Colombia rated the song No. 8 on its list of the 100 most important Colombian songs of all time.

The song has been recorded by multiple artists, including Garzón y Collazos, Soraya, Gabino Pampini, Alfredo Rolando Ortiz, Jimmy Salcedo y Su Onda Tres, Manuel Villanueva y Su Orquesta, Orlando Carrizosa, Toño Fuentes, Carmiña Gallo, and Silva Y Villalba.

References

External links
 José A. Morales at Spanish Wikipedia

Colombian songs